Dipchasphecia sertavula is a moth of the family Sesiidae. It is found only in the Sertavul Pass in southern Turkey.

The larvae feed on the roots of Acantholimon species.

References

Moths described in 2002
Sesiidae
Endemic fauna of Turkey
Moths of Asia